Tartu Airport  is an airport in Reola, Ülenurme Parish,  south southwest of Tartu, the second largest city in Estonia. It is also called Ülenurme Airport due to its proximity to the village of Ülenurme. The Tallinn–Tartu–Võru–Luhamaa highway (E263) passes near the airport.

History
The airport was opened on 15 May 1946. A new terminal building was built in 1981, and the runway and taxiway were also upgraded then. In 2010, Tartu International Airport served 23,504 passengers.

Airlines and destinations

As of 13 November 2022, there are no regular commercial passenger flights to/from Tartu.
Tartu's city government in February 2023 said it was aiming to find an airline to operate flights to Helsinki from autumn 2023 in return for a subsidy.

Statistics
List of the busiest airports in the Baltic states

See also
Estonian Aviation Academy
Estonian Aviation Museum
Raadi Airfield (Tartu Air Base)

References

External links
 
 
 

Airports in Estonia
Airport
Kambja Parish
1940s establishments in Estonia
Buildings and structures in Tartu County
International airports in Estonia